Cicero Public School District 99 is a school district in Illinois. It has its headquarters in Cicero.

Schools

K-6:
 Burnham School
 Drexel School
 Wilson School

4-6:
 Cicero East School
 Columbus East School

Pre-K-4:
 Cicero West School
 Columbus West School

Pre-K:
 Early Childhood Center

Pre-K-6:
 Goodwin School
 Lincoln School
 Sherlock School
 Warren Park School

K-3:
 Liberty School

5-8:
 McKinley School (Alternative)

5-6:
 Roosevelt School

7-8:
 Unity Junior High School

References

External links

 Cicero Public School District 99

School districts in Cook County, Illinois
Cicero, Illinois